FC Krasyliv was a Ukrainian football team that played in Krasyliv, Khmelnytskyi Oblast.

History
The club entered the professional leagues in 2001. The club was initially successful finishing in 3rd place in the Druha Liha Group "A". The next season they were crowned champions and were promoted to the Persha Liha for the 2002–03 season.

The club, coming from a small provincial town was under financial duress and in 2003–04 they forged a union with Obolon and became their farm club under the name Krasyliv-Obolon.

Before the next season started FC Podillya Khmelnytskyi who finish 2nd in the Ukrainian Second League 2003-04 season merges with Krasyliv-Obolon and moves the team operations from Khmelnytskyi to Krasyliv prior to the start of season.

Honors

Ukrainian Druha Liha: 1
 2001/02 Champions Group A

League and cup history

Notes
 FC Podillya Khmelnytskyi merged with FC Krasyliv-Obolon (13th Ukrainian First League 2003-04) and excluded from the professional competition being replaced by Krasyliv that was renamed into Podillia

References

External links
 Mykhailo Vasylevskyi. "Paradiz" in the center of hell, or At the dawn of Capitalism in Krasyliv. The Day. 11 February 2000
 Oleksandr Travyanka. ''Petro Arsenyuk: One of my goals is revival of professional football at the Khmelnytskyi region (Петро АРСЕНЮК: «Одна з моїх цілей — відродження професіонального футболу на Хмельниччині»). Ukrayinskyi Futbol.

 
Football clubs in Khmelnytskyi Oblast
Defunct football clubs in Ukraine
Association football clubs established in 2000
Association football clubs disestablished in 2007
2000 establishments in Ukraine
2007 disestablishments in Ukraine